Ogrodniczki may refer to the following places in Poland:

 Ogrodniczki, Gmina Juchnowiec Kościelny
 Ogrodniczki, Gmina Supraśl